In enzymology, histidinol dehydrogenase (HIS4) (HDH) is an enzyme that catalyzes the chemical reaction

L-histidinol + 2 NAD+  L-histidine + 2 NADH + 2 H+

Thus, the two substrates of this enzyme are L-histidinol and NAD+, whereas its 3 products are L-histidine, NADH, and H+.

This enzyme belongs to the family of oxidoreductases, specifically those acting on the CH-OH group of donor with NAD+ or NADP+ as acceptor. The systematic name of this enzyme class is L-histidinol:NAD+ oxidoreductase. This enzyme is also called L-histidinol dehydrogenase.

Histidinol dehydrogenase catalyzes the terminal step in the biosynthesis of histidine in bacteria, fungi, and plants, the four-electron oxidation of L-histidinol to histidine.

In 4-electron dehydrogenases, a single active site catalyses 2 separate oxidation steps: oxidation of the substrate alcohol to an intermediate aldehyde; and oxidation of the aldehyde to the product acid, in this case His. The reaction proceeds via a tightly- or covalently-bound inter-mediate, and requires the presence of 2 NAD molecules. By contrast with most dehydrogenases, the substrate is bound before the NAD coenzyme. A Cys residue has been implicated in the catalytic mechanism of the second oxidative step.

In bacteria HDH is a single chain polypeptide; in fungi it is the C-terminal domain of a multifunctional enzyme which catalyses three different steps of histidine biosynthesis; and in plants it is expressed as a nuclear encoded protein precursor which is exported to the chloroplast.

Co-regulation of the gene
Histodinol dehydrogenase gene (HIS4) has been shown co-regulating the adjacent gene while it is under amino acids selective pressure.

Structural studies

References

Further reading
 
 
 
 

Protein families
EC 1.1.1
NADH-dependent enzymes
Enzymes of known structure